Thomas Hopkins (born 13 April 1984) is an American water polo player. He is 5'11”  and 185 lbs. He is a member of the United States men's national water polo team and competed at the 2007 FINA Men's Water Polo World League.

He studied at the Coronado High School. He played college water polo at Stanford University. He competed at the 2004 NCAA Men's Water Polo Championship and 2005 NCAA Men's Water Polo Championship.

References

American male water polo players
Stanford Cardinal men's water polo players
Living people
1984 births